Gustavo Kuerten defeated Hicham Arazi in the final, 6–3, 6–2, 6–4 to win the singles tennis title at the 2001 Monte Carlo Masters.

Cédric Pioline was the defending champion, but lost in the third round to Arazi.

Seeds

Draw

Finals

Top half

Section 1

Section 2

Bottom half

Section 3

Section 4

Qualifying

Qualifying seeds

Qualifiers

Qualifying draw

First qualifier

Second qualifier

Third qualifier

Fourth qualifier

Fifth qualifier

Sixth qualifier

Seventh qualifier

Eighth qualifier

External links
 Tournament profile (ITF)
 Main draw (ATP)
 Qualifying draw (ATP)

2001 Monte Carlo Masters
Singles